Christopher G. "Chris" Korge is an American attorney, political fundraiser, lobbyist and real estate developer serving as the finance chair of the Democratic National Committee.

Education 
Korge earned an associate degree from Miami Dade College and a Juris Doctor from the Temple University Beasley School of Law.

Career 
Prior to his role in DNC leadership, Korge was a Democratic Party bundler. Korge was a major fundraiser and National Co-Finance Chair for the Al Gore 2000 presidential campaign, Hillary Clinton 2008 presidential campaign, and Barack Obama 2012 presidential campaign. He was also a prominent fundraiser for Alex Penelas.

Korge became finance director of the Democratic National Committee in May 2019, succeeding Henry R. Muñoz III.

References 

Living people
Florida Democrats
Democratic National Committee people
Florida lawyers
American lobbyists
Miami Dade College alumni
Temple University Beasley School of Law alumni
People from Miami-Dade County, Florida
People from Coral Gables, Florida
Year of birth missing (living people)